Jacob J. Aulenbacher (May 3, 1857 – February 26, 1931) was a member of the Wisconsin State Assembly.

Biography
Aulenbacher was born on May 3, 1857 in Richfield, Washington County, Wisconsin. He died at his farm near Richfield on February 26, 1931.

Career
Aulenbacher was a member of the Assembly during the 1915 and 1917 sessions. Other positions he held include Town Supervisor, Assessor and Town Chairman of Richfield. He was also a member of the Washington County, Wisconsin Republican committee.

References

External links

People from Richfield, Washington County, Wisconsin
Republican Party members of the Wisconsin State Assembly
Mayors of places in Wisconsin
1857 births
1931 deaths